Chomutov District is a district in the Ústí nad Labem Region of the Czech Republic. Its capital is the city of Chomutov.

Administrative division
Chomutov District is divided into two administrative districts of municipalities with extended competence: Chomutov and Kadaň.

List of municipalities
Cities and towns are marked in bold and market towns in italics:

Bílence -
Blatno -
Boleboř -
Březno -
Černovice -
Chbany -
Chomutov -
Domašín -
Droužkovice -
Hora Svatého Šebestiána -
Hrušovany -
Jirkov -
Kadaň -
Kalek -
Klášterec nad Ohří -
Kovářská -
Křimov -
Kryštofovy Hamry -
Libědice -
Loučná pod Klínovcem -
Málkov -
Mašťov -
Měděnec -
Místo -
Nezabylice -
Okounov -
Otvice -
Perštejn -
Pesvice -
Pětipsy -
Račetice -
Radonice -
Rokle -
Spořice -
Strupčice -
Údlice -
Vejprty -
Veliká Ves -
Vilémov -
Vrskmaň -
Všehrdy -
Všestudy -
Výsluní -
Vysoká Pec

Geography

Chomutov District borders Germany in the north. The district consists of two distinct parts, the forested and mountainous landscape in the northwest and the flat, mainly agricultural landscape in the southeast. The territory extends into three geomorphological mesoregions: Most Basin (south and east), Ore Mountains (north and west), and Doupov Mountains (small part in the southwest).

The most important river is the Ohře, which flows across the southern part of the territory. Notable are the rivers Bílina and Chomutovka that springs here and drain the northern part. The largest bodies of water are the reservoirs Nechranice, the sixth largest reservoir in the country, and Přísečnice. There are also several ponds and the artificial lake Kamencové jezero.

There are no large-scale protected areas.

Demographics

Most populated municipalities

Economy
The largest employers with its headquarters in Chomutov District and at least 500 employers are:

Transport
The D7 motorway from Prague leads to Chomutov.

Sights

Mědník Hill in Měděnec was designated a UNESCO World Heritage Site in 2019 as part of the transnational Ore Mountain Mining Region.

The most important monument in the district and the only one protected as a national cultural monument is the Franciscan monastery with the Church of Fourteen Holy Helpers in Kadaň.

The best-preserved settlements and landscapes, protected as monument reservations and monument zones, are:
Kadaň (monument reservation)
Chomutov
Klášterec nad Ohří
Mašťov
Mining landscape Háj–Kovářská–Mědník

The most visited tourist destination is the Chomutov Zoo.

References

External links

Chomutov District profile on the Czech Statistical Office's website

 
Districts of the Czech Republic